was a retainer of the Shimazu clan during the Edo period.  He served under Shimazu Yoshihisa. On 1568, he became a Karō for his services.

He was known as a skilled commander in battle.  On 1578, Ōtomo Yoshishige attacked the Shimazu clan and Arinobu gathered 500 troops to hold ground at Takajo Castle. In the Battle of Mimigawa that followed, the Shimazu army defeated the Otomo who retreated under heavy losses.  The Otomo losses included commanders like Kamachi Akimori, from which it never recovered.

In 1586, when Toyotomi Hideyoshi launched the invasion of Kyūshū and Shimazu clan territory, Arinobu again gathered a handful of troops to take a defensive stand after the main body of the army led by Shimazu Yoshihisa had lost. Refusing to surrender to Toyotomi's troops, Arinobu surrendered only after Yoshihisa ordered him to surrender and offered Toyotomi his son Yamada Arinaga as hostage.

Yamada died in 1609 and it is said that Yoshihisa prayed in front of his coffin, thanking him for his long service.

Reference

1544 births
1609 deaths
Samurai